Herbert B. "Bus" Thompson (1912 – August 29, 2001) was an American football, basketball, track coach and college athletics administrator. He served as the head football coach at Fisk University in Nashville, Tennessee from 1950 to 1955. Thompson was also the Fisk's head basketball coach from 1950 to 1970, head track coach from 1956 to 1960, and athletic director from 1954 to 1977.

Born in Gary, West Virginia, Thompson played college football at Bluefield State College in Bluefield, West Virginia, earning black All-American honors in 1935 and 1936 and leading the Colored Intercollegiate Athletic Association—now known as the Central Intercollegiate Athletic Association (CIAA)—in scoring in 1935. He played professionally with the New York Brown Bombers in 1937. Thompson began his coaching career as athletic director and head coach of football, basketball, and baseball at Morristown College in Morristown, Tennessee. He was the head basketball coach at Morris Brown College in Atlanta from 1945 to 1950.

Thompson died of pneumonia, on August 29, 2001, at East Alabama Medical Center in Opelika, Alabama.

Head coaching record

College football

References

External links
 

1912 births
2001 deaths
Bluefield State Big Blues football players
Fisk Bulldogs athletic directors
Fisk Bulldogs football coaches
Fisk Bulldogs men's basketball coaches
Morris Brown Wolverines men's basketball coaches
College golf coaches in the United States
College track and field coaches in the United States
People from Gary, West Virginia
Coaches of American football from West Virginia
Players of American football from West Virginia
Baseball coaches from West Virginia
Basketball coaches from West Virginia
African-American coaches of American football
African-American players of American football
African-American baseball coaches
African-American basketball coaches
20th-century African-American sportspeople